Sian Hayley "Leo" Proctor (March 28, 1970, Hagåtña, Guam) is an American commercial astronaut, geology professor, and science communicator. She was also the education outreach officer for the first Hawai’i Space Exploration Analog and Simulation (HI-SEAS) Mission. 

On September 15, 2021, she was launched into Earth's orbit as the pilot of the Crew Dragon space capsule, as part of the Inspiration4 private orbital spaceflight. As the pilot on this mission, she became the first African American woman to pilot a spacecraftShe is also a Major in the Civil Air Patrol where she serves as the aerospace education officer for its Arizona Wing.

Biography
She was born in Hagåtña, Guam on March 28, 1970, to a Sperry Univac engineer who was working for NASA at the Guam Remote Ground Terminal during the Apollo era. After the Moon landings, Proctor's family moved to Minnesota and later to various Northeastern states while her father changed jobs. Her family moved to Fairport, New York, when she was 14 where she later graduated from Fairport High School.

She studied at Arizona State University, where she received an undergraduate degree on environmental sciences and later a masters degree in Geology in 1998. In 2006 she obtained a  PhD in Science education.

She is a member of the Association of Space Explorers.. Furthermore in December 2022 she was selected as a member of the National Space Council’s Users Advisory Group.

In 2022 she received the honorary degree of Doctor of Humane Letters from University of Massachusetts Lowell.

In 2023 she participated in the space camp Space 2101 at King Abdullah University of Science and Technology.

Space career

2009 NASA Astronaut Selection 
She was a finalist for the 2009 NASA Astronaut Selection Process. She was one of 47 finalists competing against over 3,500 applicants. Nonetheless, during the final round, she was not one of the nine astronaut candidates selected for the 2009 NASA Astronaut Group.

Commercial astronaut during the mission Inspiration4 
She was selected as the pilot of the Crew Dragon mission Inspiration4, which launched on September 15, 2021. The Prosperity seat, was obtained as she won an entrepreneur competition. During the flight training she received the call sign Leo.

She was joined by Jared Isaacman, Hayley Arceneaux, and Chris Sembroski, for the first all-civilian human spaceflight mission. In August 2021 she is featured on the cover of a Time magazine double issue with the rest of the crew of Inspiration4.

Career in science education

HI-SEAS (2013) 
She acted as education outreach officer for the NASA-funded Hawai’i Space Exploration Analog and Simulation (HI-SEAS) mission. The purpose of the mission was to investigate food strategies for long duration spaceflight and missions to the Moon or Mars.

During the four-month simulation, Proctor was hired by Discover Magazine as the photographer for Kate Greene's article Simulating Mars on Earth. She also filmed the Meals for Mars YouTube series while in the Mars simulation.

PolarTREC (2014) 
In 2014, she was selected as a PolarTREC teacher, which is a program funded by the National Science Foundation (NSF) that connects teachers with scientists conducting research in the arctic and Antarctic regions. As part of this porgram, she spent a month in Barrow, Alaska learning historical ecology for risk management and investigating the impact of climate change on the coastline and community.

Astronomy in Chile Educator Ambassadors Program (ACEAP) (2016) 
In 2016 she was selected as a ACEAP Ambassador. A program from the National Science Foundation (NSF) that sends K–16 formal and informal astronomy educators to US astronomy facilities in Chile. During the summer of 2016, she joined eight other ambassadors as they visited Cerro Tololo Inter-American Observatory (CTIO), Gemini South Observatory, and the Atacama Large Millimeter-submillimeter Array (ALMA).

Proctor returned to San Pedro, Chile in 2017 to engage in STEM education outreach activities with the local high school and surrounding community.

NOAA Teacher At Sea (2017) 
She participated in the National Oceanic and Atmospheric Administration (NOAA) Teacher At Sea program in 2017. The program was started in 1990 and provides teachers with research experience working at sea. In her case, during three weeks she conducted pollock research in Bering Sea on the fisheries vessel the Oscar Dyson and detailed her experience for the blog of NOAA.

Science comunication 
She is an international speaker, communicating about science education, lidership, spacial simulations, sustainable foods and diversity in science. Furthermore, she has given several TEDx talks.

Appearances in television 
Her scientific career and work have been motive of multiple appearances in television, among whihc it can be found:

 2010: Season 2 of The Colony,a ten episodes show that was filmed in New Orleans.
 2012: Appearance in two episodes of the first season of The STEM Journals, an educational show for kids interested in science, technology, engineering, and math.
 2016: Appearance in episode 2: Are We Alone of the series Genius by Stephen Hawking 
 From 2017 to 2019 she acted as the science demonstrator on the Science Channel show Strange Evidence.
 2020: Phantom signals.
 2021: Ancient unexplained files.
 2021: When Big Things Go Wrong, a series for The History Channel which explains the science of disasters.
 2021: Participated in the series Countdown: Inspiration4 Mission to Space. An original Netflix series.

References

External links

Sian Proctor's South Mountain Community College Website
Tourist Biography: Sian Proctor

Living people
Arizona State University alumni
Edinboro University of Pennsylvania alumni
African-American women scientists
American geologists
HI-SEAS
American women scientists
1970 births
Spaceflight participants
Women astronauts
Women space scientists
SpaceX astronauts
American astronauts
Inspiration4